Salado River is a river of southern Cuba. It is a tributary of the Cauto River.

See also
List of rivers of Cuba

References

Rivers of Cuba